Charles Cook (born 3 June 1898) was a Scottish professional footballer who played as an outside left.

Career
Born in Glasgow, Cook played for Bellshill Athletic, Bradford City, Bury, Wigan Borough, Coventry City and Bradford Park Avenue. For Bradford City he made 7 appearances in the Football League, as well as 1 FA Cup appearance.

Sources

References

1898 births
Year of death missing
Scottish footballers
Bellshill Athletic F.C. players
Bradford City A.F.C. players
Bury F.C. players
English Football League players
Wigan Borough F.C. players
Coventry City F.C. players
Bradford (Park Avenue) A.F.C. players
Association football outside forwards